Totogalpa is a municipality in the Madriz department of Nicaragua.

Municipalities of the Madriz Department